Warburgia is a genus of plant in family Canellaceae described as a genus in 1895. It was named for the German botanist Otto Warburg.  It is native to eastern and southern Africa.

All four species have medicinal uses. Extracts of Warburgia ugandensis have been reported to show some antimalarial properties in animal models.

Species
 Warburgia elongata Verdc. - Tanzania
 Warburgia salutaris (Bertol.f.) Chiov. - Zimbabwe, Mozambique, Limpopo, Mpumalanga, KwaZulu-Natal
 Warburgia stuhlmannii Engl. - Tanzania, Kenya
 Warburgia ugandensis Sprague - Uganda, Kenya, Tanzania, Zaire, Ethiopia to Malawi

References

Canellaceae
Canellales genera
Medicinal plants
Flora of Africa
Taxonomy articles created by Polbot
Afrotropical realm flora